A summary of the year 2004 in the Irish music industry.

Summary

March 
 Tickets for Oxegen 2004, the festival that would in years to come be a worthy successor to Witnness, went on sale on Friday 5 March. One-day tickets cost €59.50, two-day tickets were priced at €110.00 whilst a two-day ticket with camping included cost €130.00.

June 
 On Friday 11 June tickets for Dido's August performance at Marlay Park in Dublin, supported by Scissor Sisters, went on sale priced at €55.
 On Saturday 12 June Red Hot Chili Peppers played Phoenix Park, supported by The Thrills, The Pixies, Groove Armada and Hothouse Flowers. It was their fourth consecutive year to appear in Ireland.
 On 25 June tickets for The White Stripes two August shows in Dublin's  Marlay Park and the Belfast Botanic Gardens went on sale.
 On Wednesday 30 June it was announced that David Bowie would be unable to headline his scheduled slot on the Sunday night of Oxegen 2004.

July 
 Oxegen 2004 took place on Saturday 10 and Sunday 11 July, headlined by The Darkness, The Strokes and The Cure. It was the natural successor to Witnness and like the previous year's festival was held at Punchestown Racecourse, County Kildare. It was the first of two new festivals this year that would leave a permanent mark on the Irish music scene in later years.

August 
 On 24 August The White Stripes played Marlay Park in Dublin. On 25 August they played Belfast's Botanic Gardens. They were supported at both shows by New York Dolls.
 On 25 August Dido played Marlay Park in Dublin with support from Scissor Sisters.
 The first Electric Picnic was held at Stradbally, County Laois. Beginning as a one-day event, it was soon to become an international hit, and it wasn't long before it was catching up on Oxegen in popularity. Its patrons praised it for its unique atmosphere and, although it didn't attract the same internationally recognised acts as Oxegen, it became very much a fixture in later years.

November 
 19 November saw the Irish release of the internationally anticipated eleventh studio album by U2. How to Dismantle an Atomic Bomb debuted at #1 in 34 countries and worldwide sales as of 2006 number close to 10 million copies sold. The album was preceded by the lead single "Vertigo", released for radio airplay on 24 September, when it received extensive airplay and topped the charts in several countries when it was released on 8 November.

December 
 On 1 December Foo Fighters were confirmed as the Sunday night headliner for Oxegen 2005.
 On 10 December The Prodigy were confirmed for Oxegen 2005.

Bands formed 
 The Chakras
 Dark Room Notes
 The Flaws
 Glyder
 Lluther
 Travega (January)
 Triega (July)

Bands disbanded 
 Moloko

Bands reformed 
 Planxty
 The Radiators from Space (as The Radiators (Plan 9))

Albums & EPs 
Below is a list of notable albums & EPs released by Irish artists in Ireland in 2004.

 Absent Friends – The Divine Comedy (29 March 2004)
 Meltdown – Ash (17 May 2004)
 Kindness – The Radio (August 2004) 
 Let's Bottle Bohemia – The Thrills (13 September 2004)
 Burn the Maps – The Frames (17 September 2004)
 Bavarian EP – The Divine Comedy (25 October 2004) – (EP downloadable from official website)
 How to Dismantle an Atomic Bomb – U2 (19 November 2004)
Unknown
 Nightrock – The Chalets (2004) – (EP)
 Something Ilk – Cathy Davey (2004)
 Listening In: Radio Sessions 1978-1982 (Live) – The Undertones (2004)

Singles 
Below is a list of notable singles released by Irish artists in Ireland in 2004.

Date unknown
 "Whatever Happened to Corey Haim?" – The Thrills (??? 2004)
 "Not for All the Love in the World" – The Thrills (??? 2004)

Festivals

Oxegen 2004 
 Oxegen 2004 took place at Punchestown Racecourse in County Kildare on Saturday 9 July and Sunday 11 July. It was headlined by The Darkness, The Cure and The Strokes, whilst Kings of Leon, PJ Harvey, The Divine Comedy, The Libertines, Franz Ferdinand, Scissor Sisters, Muse, Faithless, Massive Attack, Basement Jaxx and Chemical Brothers also appeared.

Electric Picnic 2004 
 Electric Picnic 2004 took place in Stradbally Estate, County Laois. It was headlined by Groove Armada, Super Furry Animals, Jurassic 5, David Kitt, Mylo and Erol Alkan.

Heineken Green Energy 
 Heineken Green Energy took place for the 9th year in 2004, featuring The Streets and The Stooges.

Slane 2004 
 Slane 2004 was headlined by Madonna, supported by Paul Oakenfold and Iggy Pop and the Stooges.

Music awards

2004 Meteor Awards 
The 2004 Meteor Awards were held on ???, 2004. Below are the winners:

Choice Music Prize 
The Choice Music Prize did not exist this year.

References

External links 
 IMRO website
 IRMA website
 Hot Press website
 State website
 MUSE.ie
 CLUAS.com
 News at Phantom FM
 Music at The Irish Times
 Music at the Irish Independent
 Music news and album reviews at RTÉ